was established in Wakkanai, Hokkaidō, Japan in 1961. Located on a hillside overlooking the Sōya Straits, within the park there are a number of memorials that, along with those of Cape Sōya, that to the Chihaku ferry near the North Breakwater Dome, the Northern Memorial Museum inside the park, and the Wakkanai Karafuto Museum, together help give Wakkanai the greatest density of "proxy" Karafuto lieux de mémoire in Hokkaidō.

Monuments
The  is a memorial to those who died in Karafuto. At its centre is a statue of a woman with a look of pain and anguish, her face to the heavens and hands to the earth, her back to Sakhalin. An inscription explains that the monument expresses "grief at the loss of everything held dear".

Also in the park is a monument to the Sakhalin huskies, trained in Wakkanai Park, who have served on expeditions to Antarctica. In particular it celebrates a pair of sled dogs named Tarō and Jirō, who survived for a year when the 1958 expedition was abandoned due to bad weather, while a memorial tower comforts the souls of those dogs who have perished along the way.

See also

 Karafuto 1945 Summer Hyosetsu no Mon (1974 film)
 Antarctica (1983 film)
 Evacuation of Karafuto and Kuriles
 Rishiri-Rebun-Sarobetsu National Park
 Cape Sōya

References

Wakkanai, Hokkaido
Parks and gardens in Hokkaido